Ermias Ghermay is an Ethiopian people-smuggler who is believed to be the boss of one of the main human smuggling cartels in Libya.

See also
Mered Medhanie

References

Living people
Year of birth missing (living people)
Human trafficking in Africa
Slavery in Libya